Replogle is the world's largest manufacturer of globes.

History
Replogle Globes was started by Luther Replogle (1902-1981) when, in 1930, he began selling globes which he crafted by hand in his apartment in Chicago, using maps from England. His vision was to make globes a common feature in people's households, rather than something found only in academic settings.  Luther Replogle co-founded Scanglobe in 1963. After Luther Replogle's death in 1981, Replogle Globes purchased Scanglobe's remaining interest in 1988, and moved the company to the United States in 2003 as a Replogle brand.

Products
Replogle makes metal globes, light-up globes (in glass [vintage], cardboard, and plastic), inflatable plastic globes, transparent globes, a cube-shaped globe, and a variety of globe stands.  In addition to globes of Earth, Replogle also makes globes of Venus, Mars, the Moon, and the celestial sphere.

References

External links
Replogle website
Luther I. Replogle Foundation

Companies based in Chicago
Map companies of the United States
Manufacturing companies established in 1930
1930 establishments in Illinois